Polymer electrolyte membrane (PEM) electrolysis is the electrolysis of water in a cell equipped with a solid polymer electrolyte (SPE) that is responsible for the conduction of protons, separation of product gases, and electrical insulation of the electrodes. The PEM electrolyzer was introduced to overcome the issues of partial load, low current density, and low pressure operation currently plaguing the alkaline electrolyzer. It involves a proton-exchange membrane. 

Electrolysis of water is an important technology for the production of hydrogen to be used as an energy carrier. With fast dynamic response times, large operational ranges, and high efficiencies, water electrolysis is a promising technology for energy storage coupled with renewable energy sources. In terms of sustainability and environmental impact, PEM electrolysis is considered as a promising technique for high purity and efficient hydrogen production since it emits only oxygen as a by-product without any carbon emissions.



History
The use of a PEM for electrolysis was first introduced in the 1960s by General Electric, developed to overcome the drawbacks to the alkaline electrolysis technology. The initial performances yielded 1.0 A/cm2 at 1.88 V which was, compared to the alkaline electrolysis technology of that time, very efficient. In the late 1970s the alkaline electrolyzers were reporting performances around 0.215 A/cm2 at 2.06 V, thus prompting a sudden interest in the late 1970s and early 1980s in polymer electrolytes for water electrolysis. PEM water electrolysis technology is similar to PEM fuel cell technology, where solid poly-sulfonated membranes, such as nafion, fumapem, were used as a electrolyte (proton conductor). 

A thorough review of the historical performance from the early research to that of today can be found in chronological order with many of the operating conditions in the 2013 review by Carmo et al.

Advantages
One of the largest advantages to PEM electrolysis is its ability to operate at high current densities. This can result in reduced operational costs, especially for systems coupled with very dynamic energy sources such as wind and solar, where sudden spikes in energy input would otherwise result in uncaptured energy. The polymer electrolyte allows the PEM electrolyzer to operate with a very thin membrane (~100-200 μm) while still allowing high pressures, resulting in low ohmic losses, primarily caused by the conduction of protons across the membrane (0.1 S/cm) and a compressed hydrogen output.

The polymer electrolyte membrane, due to its solid structure, exhibits a low gas crossover rate resulting in very high product gas purity. Maintaining a high gas purity is important for storage safety and for the direct usage in a fuel cell. The safety limits for H2 in O2 are at standard conditions 4 mol-% H2 in O2.

Science
An electrolyzer is an electrochemical device to convert electricity and water into hydrogen and oxygen, these gases can then be used as a means to store energy for later use. This use can range from electrical grid stabilization from dynamic electrical sources such as wind turbines and solar cells to localized hydrogen production as a fuel for fuel cell vehicles. The PEM electrolyzer utilizes a solid polymer electrolyte (SPE) to conduct protons from the anode to the cathode while insulating the electrodes electrically. Under standard conditions the enthalpy required for the decomposition of water is 285.9 kJ/mol. A portion of the required energy for a sustained electrolysis reaction is supplied by thermal energy and the remainder is supplied through electrical energy.

Reactions
The actual value for open circuit voltage of an operating electrolyzer will lie between the 1.23 V and 1.48 V depending on how the cell/stack design utilizes the thermal energy inputs. This is however quite difficult to determine or measure because an operating electrolyzer also experiences other voltage losses from internal electrical resistances, proton conductivity, mass transport through the cell and catalyst utilization to name a few.

Anode reaction
The half reaction taking place on the anode side of a PEM electrolyzer is commonly referred to as the Oxygen Evolution Reaction (OER). Here the liquid water reactant is supplied to catalyst where the supplied water is oxidized to oxygen, protons and electrons.

{| style="border:1px solid #ccc;"
|-
||
2 H2O (l) -> O2 (g) + 4H+ (aq) + 4 e^-
|}

Cathode reaction
The half reaction taking place on the cathode side of a PEM electrolyzer is commonly referred to as the Hydrogen Evolution Reaction (HER). Here the supplied electrons and the protons that have conducted through the membrane are combined to create gaseous hydrogen.

{| style="border:1px solid #ccc;"
|-
|| 4H+ (aq) + 4 e^- -> 2H2 (g)
|}

The illustration below depicts a simplification of how PEM electrolysis works, showing the individual half-reactions together along with the complete reaction of a PEM electrolyzer. In this case the electrolyzer is coupled with a solar panel for the production of hydrogen, however the solar panel could be replaced with any source of electricity.

Second law of thermodynamics
As per the second law of thermodynamics the enthalpy of the reaction is:

{| style="border:1px solid #ccc;"
|-
|| 
|}

{| style="border:1px solid #ccc;"
|-
|| H2O (l) + \Delta H -> H2 + 1/2 O2
|}

The overall cell reaction with thermodynamic energy inputs then becomes:

{| style="border:1px solid #ccc;"
|-
|| H2O (l) ->[+\overbrace{237.2 \ \ce{kJ / mol}}^{\ce{electricity}}][+\underbrace{48.6 \ \ce{kJ / mol}}_{\ce{heat}}] {H2} + 1/2 O2
|}

The thermal and electrical inputs shown above represent the minimum amount of energy that can be supplied by electricity in order to obtain an electrolysis reaction. Assuming that the maximum amount of heat energy (48.6 kJ/mol) is supplied to the reaction, the reversible cell voltage  can be calculated.

Open circuit voltage (OCV)

The calculation of cell voltage assuming no irreversibilities exist and all of the thermal energy is utilized by the reaction is referred to as the lower heating value (LHV). The alternative formulation, using the higher heating value (HHV) is calculated assuming that all of the energy to drive the electrolysis reaction is supplied by the electrical component of the required energy which results in a higher reversible cell voltage. When using the HHV the voltage calculation is referred to as the thermoneutral voltage.

Voltage losses
The performance of electrolysis cells, like fuel cells, is typically compared through polarization curves, which are obtained by plotting cell voltages against current densities. The primary sources of increased voltage in a PEM electrolyzer (the same also applies for PEM fuel cells) can be categorized into three main areas, Ohmic losses, activation losses and mass transport losses. Due to the reversal of operation between a PEM fuel cell and a PEM electrolyzer, the degree of impact for these various losses is different between the two processes.

{| style="border:1px solid #ccc;"
|-
|| 
|}

A PEM electrolysis system's performance can be compared by plotting overpotential versus cell current density. This essentially results in a curve that represents the power per square centimeter of cell area required to produce hydrogen and oxygen. Conversely to the PEM fuel cell, the better the PEM electrolyzer the lower the cell voltage at a given current density. The figure below is the result of a simulation from the Forschungszentrum Jülich of a 25 cm2 single cell PEM electrolyzer under thermoneutral operation depicting the primary sources of voltage loss and their contributions for a range of current densities.

Ohmic losses
Ohmic losses are an electrical overpotential introduced to the electrolysis process by the internal resistance of the cell components. This loss then requires an additional voltage to maintain the electrolysis reaction, the prediction of this loss follows Ohm's law and holds a linear relationship to the current density of the operating electrolyzer.

{| style="border:1px solid #ccc;"
|-
|| 
|}

The energy loss due to the electrical resistance is not entirely lost. The voltage drop due to resistivity is associated with the conversion the electrical energy to heat energy through a process known as Joule heating. Much of this heat energy is carried away with the reactant water supply and lost to the environment, however a small portion of this energy is then recaptured as heat energy in the electrolysis process. The amount of heat energy that can be recaptured is dependent on many aspects of system operation and cell design.

{| style="border:1px solid #ccc;"
|-
|| 
|}

The Ohmic losses due to the conduction of protons contribute to the loss of efficiency which also follows Ohm's law, however without the Joule heating effect. The proton conductivity of the PEM is very dependent on the hydration, temperature, heat treatment, and ionic state of the membrane.

Faradaic losses and crossover
Faradaic losses describe the efficiency losses that are correlated to the current, that is supplied without leading to hydrogen at the cathodic gas outlet. The produced hydrogen and oxygen can permeate across the membrane, referred to as crossover. Mixtures of both gases at the electrodes result. At the cathode, oxygen can be catalytically reacted with hydrogen on the platinum surface of the cathodic catalyst. At the anode, hydrogen and oxygen do not react at the iridium oxide catalyst. Thus, safety hazards due to explosive anodic mixtures hydrogen in oxygen can result. The supplied energy for the hydrogen production is lost, when hydrogen is lost due to the reaction with oxygen at the cathode and permeation from the cathode across the membrane to the anode corresponds. Hence, the ratio of the amount of lost and produced hydrogen determines the faradaic losses. At pressurized operation of the electrolyzer, the crossover and the correlated faradaic efficiency losses increase.

Hydrogen compression during water electrolysis
Hydrogen evolution due to pressurized electrolysis is comparable to an isothermal compression process, which is in terms of efficiency preferable compared to mechanical isotropic compression. However, the contributions of the aforementioned faradaic losses increase with operating pressures. Thus, in order to produce compressed hydrogen, the in-situ compression during electrolysis and subsequent compression of the gas have to be pondered under efficiency considerations.

System operation

The ability of the PEM electrolyzer to operate, not only under highly dynamic conditions but also in part-load and overload conditions is one of the reasons for the recently renewed interest in this technology. The demands of an electrical grid are relatively stable and predictable, however when coupling these to energy sources such as wind and solar, the demand of the grid rarely matches the generation of renewable energy. This means energy produced from renewable sources such as wind and solar benefit by having a buffer, or a means of storing off-peak energy. , the largest PEM electrolyzer is 20 MW.

PEM efficiency
When determining the electrical efficiency of PEM electrolysis, the HHV can be used. This is because the catalyst layer interacts with water as steam. As the process operates at 80 °C for PEM electrolysers the waste heat can be redirected through the system to create the steam, resulting in a higher overall electrical efficiency. The LHV must be used for alkaline electrolysers as the process within these electrolysers requires water in liquid form and uses alkalinity to facilitate the breaking of the bond holding the hydrogen and oxygen atoms together. The lower heat value must also be used for fuel cells, as steam is the output rather than input.

PEM electrolysis has an electrical efficiency of about 80% in working application, in terms of hydrogen produced per unit of electricity used to drive the reaction. The efficiency of PEM electrolysis is expected to reach 82-86% before 2030, while also maintaining durability as progress in this area continues at a pace.

See also

Electrochemistry
Electrochemical engineering
Electrolysis
Hydrogen production
Gas cracker
Photocatalytic water splitting
Water purification
Timeline of hydrogen technologies
Electrolysis of water
PEM fuel cell
Hydrogen economy
High-pressure electrolysis

References

Electrolysis
Hydrogen economy
Hydrogen production
Electrolytic cells